Ton van Loon (born October 10, 1956 in Weert) is a commander from the Netherlands. He is a Lieutenant General employed by NATO who took control of the International Security Assistance Force (ISAF), Regional Command South (RC-S) on November 1, 2006 until May 1, 2007. From April 13, 2010 until September 25, 2013, he commanded I. German/Dutch Corps. He is married and has two children.

Biography
Van Loon was born on Weert into a military family. He is the son of a sergeant major in the infantry.

Van Loon enrolled in the Koninklijke Militaire Academie in Breda in 1977. Graduating from the academy in 1981 he was assigned to the 41st Artillery Battalion stationed in Seedorf. He held several different positions with the 41st before returning to The Netherlands to continue his military education.

Starting in 1990, Van Loon attended the Royal Netherlands Army Staff College at The Hague, following staff officer training courses. This led to a staff officer position with the 13th Mechanized Brigade in Oirschot starting in 1992. In this position he was able to leverage and solidify his earlier experiences in international military cooperation by organizing the first rotations of the Royal Netherlands Army at the (US) Combat Manoeuvre and Training Centre in Hohenfels. He also gained experience with modern training methods when he played a leading role in the introduction of instrumented training in the Army.

In 1995 he attended the British Army Command and Staff College, after which he returned to international military cooperation with a staff position at the I. German/Dutch Corps in Münster. As staff officer in charge of training he organized several large training exercises and worked on further command integration until March 1998 when he was assigned command of the 11th Artillery Battalion.

As Battalion Commander he was deployed to Kosovo in 1999 as part of the KFOR1 Multinational Brigade South (under German command). He received a knighthood for his leadership efforts in this mission, Knight of the Order of Orange-Nassau.

From June 2000 to January 2004 Van Loon served on the Staff of the Royal Netherlands Army in The Hague. In this period he was promoted twice (first to colonel, then to brigadier general) and held the Chief of Operations position. Again he focused on military cooperation with the German Armed Forces, becoming part of the cooperative triangle.

On January 8, 2004 he was assigned command of the 43rd Mechanized Brigade in Havelte. Under his command this brigade developed into the nucleus of the Land Component Multinational Brigade of NATO Response Force 4. NATO awarded him the NATO Meritorious Service Medal for this command.

Per October 13, 2006 Van Loon was promoted to the rank of major general, ahead of his deployment to Afghanistan. Starting November 1 he assumed command of the Regional Command South and was stationed in Kandahar. During this posting he conducted several operations and continued NATO efforts to implement the 3D (defense, diplomacy, development) program. His involvement with ISAF continued after his return to The Netherlands, where he served as senior mentor in a number of pre-deployment exercises and as subject lecturer.

Returning to Dutch-German cooperation efforts, Van Loon reported to Heidelberg in August 2007. There he served at the Allied Land
Component Command Headquarters until April 2010 as Chief of Staff, in a period that the Headquarters were transformed into a force command providing deployable teams at the operational level. Early in 2010 one of these teams was deployed to Kabul, to the ISAF Headquarters. At that occasion Van Loon was presented with the Ehrenkreuz der Bundeswehr in Gold for "his career-long efforts to improve Dutch-German cooperation".

On April 1, 2010 he was promoted to Lieutenant General ahead of his April 13 assignment to the I. German/Dutch Corps as Corps Commander. On September 25, 2013, he handed his command over the I. German/Dutch Corps over to the German Lt Gen Volker Halbauer. Upon his retiremend he was awarded by Germany with the Grand Merit Cross with Star Order of Merit of the Federal Republic of Germany and he was promoted to Officer in the Order of Orange-Nassau with swords.

Military decorations
  Officer of the Order of Orange-Nassau, with swords
  Commemorative Medal Multinational Peace Operations (variant: Former Yugoslavia)
  Commemorative Medal Peace Operations
  Kosovo Medal 
  Officers' Cross
  Army Foreign Service Medal
   Military Performance Event Cross of the Royal Dutch Reserve Officers Association 
  NATO Meritorious Service Medal
  NATO Kosovo Medal
  NATO Former Yugoslavia Medal
  Grand Merit Cross with Star of the Order of Merit of the Federal Republic of Germany
  Ehrenkreuz der Bundeswehr in Gold

External links
 http://webarchive.bac-lac.gc.ca:8080/wayback/20061216060030/http://www.army.forces.gc.ca/lf/english/6_1_1.asp?id=1409
 CURRICULUM VITAE Lieutenant General Ton van Loon

References

1956 births
Living people
People from Weert
Royal Netherlands Army generals
Royal Netherlands Army officers
Dutch military personnel of the War in Afghanistan (2001–2021)
Officers of the Order of Orange-Nassau
Recipients of the Badge of Honour of the Bundeswehr
Recipients of the NATO Meritorious Service Medal
Graduates of the Koninklijke Militaire Academie
NATO military personnel
Knights Commander of the Order of Merit of the Federal Republic of Germany